The Age of Entitlement: America Since the Sixties is a 2020 book by Christopher Caldwell of the conservative Claremont Institute think tank, that observes changes in the social and political fabric of American society since the 1960s and their impact on contemporary life.

The book, described by Brookings Institution fellow Jonathan Rausch in the New York Times as "provocative and pessimistic," puts forward a critique of radical individualism, free-market fundamentalism, and unfettered globalization, and the resulting decay of social norms and civil society institutions over the last several decades. These transformations, argues Caldwell, were enabled by both left- and right-wing political parties, but have been detrimental to wide swaths of the American public, particularly in the nation's interior, but "perhaps the author should have come up for oxygen when he found himself suggesting that the Southern segregationists were right all along". Describing Caldwell's account as "pessimistic", Rausch says that its "one-eyed moral bookkeeping" offers no constructive alternative to endless cultural warfare, while noting that this "seems to be where American conservatism is going". 

The book has received considerable attention for its chapters addressing the consequences of the Civil Rights Act of 1964. Although originally conceived as a one-time corrective to end segregation and racial discrimination, Caldwell argues that the Act created an endless imperative for social reengineering, at great cost and at the expense of liberty and social cohesion.

The Wall Street Journal listed it as one of their Best Political Books of 2020.

Writing in The Washington Post, Benjamin C Waterhouse, associate professor of history at the University of North Carolina at Chapel Hill, describes the book's premise as "ahistorical". America's Constitution was not "fixed in cement between 1789 and 1964, only to become tragically untethered by a law that sought, essentially, to enforce the then-96-year-old 14th Amendment", and the idea that civil rights are responsible for this change relies on a "long-debunked caricature of pre-1960s history". He criticizes Caldwell's narrative of "white grievance" politics. Rausch echoes Waterhouse's critique of the idea that the Civil Rights Act marks a single watershed in Constitutional history: "Reading this overwrought and strangely airless book, one would never imagine a different way of viewing things, one that rejects Caldwell’s ultimatum to 'choose between these two orders.' In that view — my own — America has seen multiple refoundings, among them the Jackson era’s populism, the Civil War era’s abolition of slavery, the Progressive era’s governmental reforms and the New Deal era’s economic and welfare interventions."

References

2020 non-fiction books
English-language books
Civil rights in the United States
Identity politics in the United States
Simon & Schuster books